RMS Empress of France, formerly SS Alsatian was an ocean liner built in 1913-1914 by William Beardmore and Company at Glasgow in Scotland for Allan Line.
In total, the ship's service history encompasses 99 trans-Atlantic voyages, 5 trans-Pacific voyages, and 8 other cruises in addition to her war service.

Service
This ship was the first North Atlantic liner with a cruiser stern. The vessel was built by William Beardmore & Co Ltd. at Glasgow. She was an 18,481 gross register tonnage ship, length 571.4 ft x beam , two funnels, two masts, four propellers and a speed of 18 knots. Her initial configuration provided accommodation for 287 1st class, 504 2nd class and 848 3rd class passengers.

The ocean liner was initially launched as SS Alsatian on 22 March 1912. She sailed from Liverpool on her maiden voyage to Saint John, New Brunswick for the Allan Line on 17 January 1914. On 22 May 1914, set out on her first trans-Atlantic crossing from Liverpool to Quebec.

Her last voyage that summer began on 17 July 1914; and when she returned to Europe, the nascent war in Europe brought a close to this truncated peacetime period of the ship's history.

World War I
During the First World War, Alsatian was converted into an Armed Merchant Cruiser, with an initial armament of eight 4.7-inch (120-mm) guns, although she was later re-armed with eight 6-inch (152-mm) guns and two 6-pounder (57-mm) anti-aircraft guns. Following conversion, she joined the 10th Cruiser Squadron patrolling off the Shetland Islands as part of the Northern Patrol maintaining the blockade of Germany. HMS Alsatian became flagship for Rear-Admiral Sir Dudley de Chair.  Later, Alsatian served as flagship for Vice-Admiral Sir Reginald Tupper.  During the war years, she became one of the first ships to be fitted with the new wireless direction-finding apparatus.  After the squadron was retired in 1917, she was re-fitted for peacetime service.

Between the wars

At war's end, the ship was added to the fleet of Canadian Pacific Ocean Services Ltd. (CP), which absorbed the entire Allan Line fleet.  On 28 September 1918, Alsatian began her first voyage from Liverpool to Canada as a newly flagged ship of the Canadian Pacific fleet. After a second, trans-Atlantic voyage, Alsatian was taken out of service for refitting at Glasgow.

The ship was renamed Empress of France on 4 April 1919.

The first voyage as Empress of France began on 26 September 1919. She sailed from Liverpool to Quebec. On 3 May 1922, her regular route was changed; and she sailed between Southampton, Cherbourg and Quebec.  On 31 May 1922, the route was modified yet again; and she sailed between Hamburg, Southampton, Cherbourg and Quebec.

Empress of France was one of four ocean liners to circumnavigate the world in 1923.

In 1924, the ship was converted from coal to oil fuel. In July 1926, her interiors were re-configured as 1st-class, 2nd-class, tourist-class and 3rd-class accommodations.  In January 1927, the interior was again re-configured as 1st-class, tourist-class and 3rd-class.

Voyages

On 9 September 1927, Empress of France set out on what was to be her final Hamburg - Southampton - Cherbourg - Quebec voyage.  On 8 September 1928, she sailed on final Southampton - Cherbourg - Quebec voyage before being transferred to the Pacific.
 
On 31 October 1928, she sailed from  Southampton for Suez, Hong Kong and Vancouver.  Subsequently sailed on the Pacific until 17 October 1929 when she left Hong Kong en route to Liverpool.
 
On 2 September 1931, Empress of France set out for what was to be her final voyage from Southampton to Cherbourg and Quebec; and in then she was laid up in the Clyde. Empress of France was scrapped at Dalmuir on 20 October 1934.  Some of its interior timber panelling was used in the extension (completed in 1937) of St John the Baptist's Catholic Church in Padiham, Lancashire.

Notable passengers
 1923

 Prince of Wales
 Sir Harold and Lady Boulton

See also
 CP Ships
 List of ocean liners
 List of ships in British Columbia
 Ronald Niel Stuart VC, DSO, Staff Captain (1924–1926)
HMS Calgarian - Alsatian's sister ship

References

Bibliography
 

 Tate, E. Mowbray. (1986).  Transpacific Steam: The Story of Steam Navigation from the Pacific Coast of North America to the Far East and the Antipodes, 1867-1941. New York: Cornwall Books.  (cloth)

External links
 Ships List:  Description, RMS Empress of France
 New York Public Library Digital Gallery: NYPL ID 92535, unknown photographer: Empress, portside view
 Prince of Wales descending steps on return from Canada

1913 ships
Ships built on the River Clyde
Steamships of the United Kingdom
Ocean liners of the United Kingdom
World War I Auxiliary cruisers of the Royal Navy
Ships of CP Ships
Steamships of Canada
Ocean liners of Canada